Paul Sample may refer to:

 Paul Sample (artist) (1896-1974), American artist known for artwork depicting 20th century New England
 Paul Sample (cartoonist) (born 1947), British cartoonist known for his strip Ogri
 Paul Sample (ice hockey) (born 1982), British ice hockey player